Volkameria inermis, the glory bower, is a species of flowering plant in the genus Volkameria of the family Lamiaceae, found in mangrove shores and coastal ofrests of Australia, Asia, Malesia and the Pacific islands. It is also naturalised in Tunisia, north of Africa.

Botany 
The tree is a shrub 1–4 metres, but it can grow into a tree with a height up to 10 m. It has woody, smooth stems. Its leaves are arranged alternately, each blade is elliptical with a length of 1.5–4 centimetres with a smooth surface and dark green on its underside.

The flower is trumpet-shaped with white petals 1.5–4 cm long and long reddish or purple stamens. It grows in clusters each made of 3 to 7 of them joined at the base. Its fruit is round or egg-shaped with a length of 1 cm, it turns from green to black when ripe. When the fruit is dried up, it breaks into 4 lobes with thick corky walls. The tree flowers and bears fruit around the same time from July to December, the fruit ripen in March.

Uses 
Its parts has many medical properties. The seeds and roots are used to treat venom from bitten by some fish and other marine animals.

References 

Lamiaceae
Flora of Asia
Flora of Oceania
Flora of Australia
Plants described in 1753
Taxa named by Carl Linnaeus